The British overseas territory of the Cayman Islands was represented at the 2006 Commonwealth Games in Melbourne.

Medals
None

Results by event

Athletics
Ronald Forbes
Robert Ibeh
Stephen Antoine Ovar Johnson
Michael Letterlough
Cydonie Mothersille
Kirk Streete-Thompson

Cycling
Duke Perrigoff Merren

Shooting
Thomas George Ebanks
Robert Harris
Christopher Jackson
Edison McLean

Squash
Jeffery Broderick
Chantelle Day

Swimming
Shaune Fraser
Andrew Mackay
Jennifer Powell
Heather Roffey

See also
Cayman Islands at the 2004 Summer Olympics
Cayman Islands at the 2007 Pan American Games
Cayman Islands at the 2008 Summer Olympics

Cayman Islands at the Commonwealth Games
Nations at the 2006 Commonwealth Games
Commonwealth Games